The following is a list of settlements in Italy whose name was changed between 1861 and today, sorted by region. This list contains only settlements within the present-day borders of Italy, but omits the German place names in South Tyrol (see Prontuario dei nomi locali dell'Alto Adige and Italianization of South Tyrol).

Abruzzo

Aosta Valley

Apulia

Basilicata

Calabria

Campania

Emilia-Romagna

Friuli-Venezia Giulia

Lazio

Liguria

Lombardy

Marche

Molise

Piedmont

Sardinia

Sicily

Trentino-South Tyrol

Tuscany

Umbria

Veneto

Uncategorised 
Most Italian cities have historical Latin names, and some have Greek or Etruscan names.

Maleventum → Beneventum → Benevento
Henna → Castrogiovanni → Enna
Mussolinia di Sicilia → Santo Pietro

Resìna → Ercolano (1969)
Ζάγκλη Zankle (Zancle Dankle) → Μεσσήνη Messene → Μεσσάνα Messana → Messina

.Renamed
 
Italy, name changes
Italy
Names of places in Italy